Hamilton Sundstrand was an American globally active corporation that manufactured and supported aerospace and industrial products for worldwide markets. A subsidiary of United Technologies Corporation, it was headquartered in Windsor Locks, Connecticut. The company was formed from the merger of Hamilton Standard and Sundstrand Corporation in 1999. In 2012, Hamilton Sundstrand was merged with Goodrich Corporation to form UTC Aerospace Systems. In 2018, UTC Aerospace Systems and Rockwell Collins combined to form Collins Aerospace.

History
On June 10, 1999, Hamilton Standard and the Sundstrand Corp. were merged, forming Hamilton Sundstrand. Hamilton Sundstrand traces its roots to the founding of the Sundstrand Corp. in 1905 and Hamilton Standard in 1910. In early 2001, Claverham Ltd was sold to Hamilton Sundstrand.

On 2 January 2008, Hamilton Sundstrand said it would commercialize the concentrated solar power tower technology and corresponding molten salt storage system developed by Rocketdyne through a new entity known as SolarReserve.

In 2012, Hamilton Sundstrand was merged with Goodrich Corporation to form UTC Aerospace Systems.

Products
Hamilton Sundstrand was among the largest global suppliers of technologically advanced aerospace and industrial products. Their three major businesses were Aircraft Systems (Commercial and Military), Industrial and Energy, and Space and Defense.

Aircraft Systems

Hamilton Sundstrand supplied integrated systems solutions for military, commercial, regional, and corporate aircraft. These included:
 Electric Systems
 Fire Suppression & Detection
 Air Management and Thermal Systems
 Auxiliary Power Units (APS2000 and APS3200 models)
 Emergency Power Systems
 Engine Systems and Externals
 Propulsion Systems
 Flight Control Systems

Industrial
The primary industrial products that were offered by HS included metering and specialty pumps, rotary screw air and gas compressors, pneumatic tools, dryers and filters, high-speed centrifugal pumps, integrally geared compressors, and sealless pumps.

Four separate companies that made up the industrial division of Hamilton Sundstrand were: 
 Milton Roy Company – Pont-Saint-Pierre, France
 Sullair – Michigan City, Indiana
 Champion Compressors – Melbourne, Australia
 Sundyne Corporation – Arvada, Colorado
 Precision Engine Controls Corporation – San Diego, California

The industrial division of Hamilton Sundstrand was sold by United Technologies in July 2012 to The Carlyle Group and BC Partners. In 2013, The four industrial companies became subsidiaries of new parent company Accudyne Industries, Inc.

Space, Land & Sea

Hamilton Sundstrand was the prime contractor for NASA’s space suit/Primary Life Support System and produced environmental control, life support, mechanical systems, and thermal control systems for international space programs.

Locations
In addition to its headquarters in Windsor Locks, Connecticut, Hamilton Sundstrand had major operations in Rockford, Illinois; San Diego, California; Chatsworth, California; Pomona, California; Phoenix, Arizona; York, Nebraska; and Puerto Rico along with numerous international sites.

Claverham Limited, was an international subsidiary of Hamilton Sundstrand based in Bristol, England.

US legal action regarding alleged engine software transfer
In June 2012, United States charged Hamilton Sundstrand, its parent company United Technologies, and Canadian affiliate Pratt & Whitney Canada, of selling engine control software to China, which aided in the development of the CAIC Z-10. While the Chinese defence ministry denied that China bought or used the software, Pratt & Whitney Canada and Hamilton Sundstrand agreed to pay more than $75 million to the U.S. government to settle the charges.

See also
 List of aircraft propeller manufacturers

References

External links

Aerospace companies of the United States
Companies based in Hartford County, Connecticut
United Technologies
Windsor Locks, Connecticut
Aircraft propeller manufacturers

de:Hamilton Sundstrand
fr:Hamilton Sundstrand